Glucosamine-6-phosphate deaminase 2 also known as GNPDA2 is an enzyme that in humans is encoded by the GNPDA2 gene.

Clinical significance 

Variants of the GNPDA2 gene may be associated with obesity.

References

Further reading